This is a list of published International Organization for Standardization (ISO) standards and other deliverables. For a complete and up-to-date list of all the ISO standards, see the ISO catalogue.

The standards are protected by copyright and most of them must be purchased. However, about 300 of the standards produced by ISO and IEC's Joint Technical Committee 1 (JTC 1) have been made freely and publicly available.

ISO 18000 – ISO 18999
 ISO/IEC 18000 Information technology – Radio frequency identification for item management
 ISO/IEC 18004:2015 Information technology – Automatic identification and data capture techniques – QR Code bar code symbology specification
 ISO/IEC 18009:1999 Information technology – Programming languages – Ada: Conformity assessment of a language processor
 ISO/IEC 18010:2002 Information technology - Pathways and spaces for customer premises cabling
 ISO/IEC 18012 Information technology - Home Electronic System - Guidelines for product interoperability
 ISO/IEC 18012-1:2004 Part 1: Introduction
 ISO/IEC 18012-2:2012 Part 2: Taxonomy and application interoperability model
 ISO/IEC 18013 Information technology – Personal identification – ISO-compliant driving license
 ISO/IEC 18013-1:2005 Part 1: Physical characteristics and basic data set
 ISO/IEC 18013-2:2008 Part 2: Machine-readable technologies
 ISO/IEC 18013-3:2017 Part 3: Access control, authentication and integrity validation
 ISO/IEC 18013-4:2019 Part 4: Test methods
 ISO/IEC 18013-5 Part 5: Mobile driving licence (mDL) application
 ISO/IEC 18014 Information technology – Security techniques – Time-stamping services
 ISO/IEC TR 18015:2006 Information technology - Programming languages, their environments and system software interfaces - Technical Report on C++ Performance
 ISO/IEC TR 18016:2003 Information technology – Message Handling Systems (MHS): Interworking with Internet e-mail
 ISO/IEC 18017:2001 Information technology – Telecommunications and information exchange between systems – Private Integrated Services Network – Mapping functions for the employment of Virtual Private Network scenarios
 ISO/IEC TR 18018:2010 Information technology - Systems and software engineering - Guide for configuration management tool capabilities
 ISO/IEC 18021:2002 Information technology – User interfaces for mobile tools for management of database communications in a client-server model
 ISO/IEC 18023 Information technology – SEDRIS
 ISO/IEC 18023-1:2006 Part 1: Functional specification
 ISO/IEC 18023-2:2006 Part 2: Abstract transmittal format
 ISO/IEC 18023-3:2006 Part 3: Transmittal format binary encoding
 ISO/IEC 18024 Information technology – SEDRIS language bindings
 ISO/IEC 18024-4:2006 Part 4: C
 ISO/IEC 18025:2005 Information technology – Environmental Data Coding Specification (EDCS)
 ISO/IEC 18026:2009 Information technology – Spatial Reference Model (SRM)
 ISO/IEC 18031:2011 Information technology - Security techniques - Random bit generation
 ISO/IEC 18032:2005 Information technology - Security techniques - Prime number generation
 ISO/IEC 18033 Information technology – Security techniques – Encryption algorithms
 ISO/IEC 18033-1:2015 Part 1: General
 ISO/IEC 18033-2:2006 Part 2: Asymmetric ciphers
 ISO/IEC 18033-3:2010 Part 3: Block ciphers
 ISO/IEC 18033-4:2011 Part 4: Stream ciphers
 ISO/IEC 18033-5:2015 Part 5: Identity-based ciphers
 ISO/IEC 18035:2003 Information technology – Icon symbols and functions for controlling multimedia software applications
 ISO/IEC 18036:2003 Information technology - Icon symbols and functions for World Wide Web browser toolbars
 ISO/IEC TR 18037:2008 Programming languages - C - Extensions to support embedded processors
 ISO/IEC 18041 Information technology – Computer graphics, image processing and environmental data representation – Environmental Data Coding Specification (EDCS) language bindings
 ISO/IEC 18041-4:2016 Part 4: C
 ISO/IEC 18042 Information technology – Computer graphics and image processing – Spatial Reference Model (SRM) language bindings
 ISO/IEC 18042-4:2006 Part 4: C
 ISO/IEC 18045:2008 Information technology - Security techniques - Methodology for IT security evaluation
 ISO/IEC 18046 Information technology - Radio frequency identification device performance test methods
 ISO/IEC 18046-1:2011 Part 1: Test methods for system performance
 ISO/IEC 18046-2:2011 Part 2: Test methods for interrogator performance
 ISO/IEC 18046-3:2012 Part 3: Test methods for tag performance
 ISO/IEC 18046-4:2015 Part 4: Test methods for performance of RFID gates in libraries
 ISO/IEC 18047 Information technology - Radio frequency identification device conformance test methods
 ISO/IEC 18047-2:2012 Part 2: Test methods for air interface communications below 135 kHz
 ISO/IEC TR 18047-3:2011 Part 3: Test methods for air interface communications at 13,56 MHz
 ISO/IEC TR 18047-4:2004 Part 4: Test methods for air interface communications at 2,45 GHz
 ISO/IEC 18047-6:2012 Part 6: Test methods for air interface communications at 860 MHz to 960 MHz
 ISO/IEC TR 18047-7:2010 Part 7: Test methods for active air interface communications at 433 MHz
 ISO/IEC 18050:2006 Information technology - Office equipment - Print quality attributes for machine readable Digital Postage Marks
 ISO/IEC 18051:2012 Information technology – Telecommunications and information exchange between systems – Services for Computer Supported Telecommunications Applications (CSTA) Phase III
 ISO/IEC 18052:2012 Information technology – Telecommunications and information exchange between systems – ASN.1 for Computer Supported Telecommunications Applications (CSTA) Phase III
 ISO/IEC TR 18053:2000 Information technology - Telecommunications and information exchange between systems - Glossary of definitions and terminology for Computer Supported Telecommunications Applications (CSTA) Phase III
 ISO/IEC 18056:2012 Information technology – Telecommunications and information exchange between systems – XML Schema Definitions for Computer Supported Telecommunications Applications (CSTA) Phase III
 ISO/IEC TR 18057:2004 Information technology – Telecommunications and information exchange between systems – Using ECMA-323 (CSTA XML) in a Voice Browser Environment 
 ISO/TS 18062:2016 Health informatics – Categorial structure for representation of herbal medicaments in terminological systems
 ISO 18064:2014 Thermoplastic elastomers – Nomenclature and abbreviated terms
 ISO 18065:2015 Tourism and related services – Tourist services for public use provided by Natural Protected Areas Authorities – Requirements
 ISO 18082:2014 Anaesthetic and respiratory equipment – Dimensions of non-interchangeable screw-threaded (NIST) low-pressure connectors for medical gases
 ISO 18091:2014 Quality management systems – Guidelines for the application of ISO 9001:2008 in local government
 ISO/IEC 18092:2013 Information technology – Telecommunications and information exchange between systems – Near Field Communication – Interface and Protocol (NFCIP-1)
 ISO/IEC 18093:1999 Information technology - Data interchange on 130 mm optical disk cartridges of type WORM (Write Once Read Many) using irreversible effects - Capacity: 5,2 Gbytes per cartridge
 ISO 18104:2014 Health informatics – Categorial structures for representation of nursing diagnoses and nursing actions in terminological systems
 ISO/TS 18110:2015 Nanotechnologies - Vocabularies for science, technology and innovation indicators
 ISO 18115 Surface chemical analysis – Vocabulary
 ISO 18115-1:2013 Part 1: General terms and terms used in spectroscopy
 ISO 18115-2:2013 Part 2: Terms used in scanning-probe microscopy
 ISO 18117:2009 Surface chemical analysis – Handling of specimens prior to analysis
 ISO 18118:2004 Surface chemical analysis - Auger electron spectroscopy and X-ray photoelectron spectroscopy - Guide to the use of experimentally determined relative sensitivity factors for the quantitative analysis of homogeneous materials
 ISO/IEC TR 18120:2016 Information technology - Learning, education, and training - Requirements for e-textbooks in education
 ISO/IEC TR 18121:2015 Information technology - Learning, education and training - Virtual experiment framework
 ISO/TR 18128:2014 Information and documentation - Risk assessment for records processes and systems
 ISO 18129:2015 Condition monitoring and diagnostics of machines – Approaches for performance diagnosis
 ISO/TS 18152 Ergonomics of human-system interaction – Specification for the process assessment of human-system issues
 ISO 18158:2016 Workplace air - Terminology
 ISO/TS 18173:2005 Non-destructive testing - General terms and definitions
 ISO/IEC 18180:2013 Information technology - Specification for the Extensible Configuration Checklist Description Format (XCCDF) Version 1.2
 ISO/IEC 18181 Information technology — JPEG XL image coding system
 ISO/IEC 18181-1:2022 Part 1: Core coding system
 ISO/IEC 18181-2:2021 Part 2: File format
 ISO 18185 Freight containers – Electronic seals
 ISO 18189:2016 Ophthalmic optics – Contact lenses and contact lens care products – Cytotoxicity testing of contact lenses in combination with lens care solution to evaluate lens/solution interactions
 ISO 18190:2016 Anaesthetic and respiratory equipment – General requirements for airways and related equipment
 ISO 18192 Implants for surgery – Wear of total intervertebral spinal disc prostheses
 ISO 18192-1:2011 Part 1: Loading and displacement parameters for wear testing and corresponding environmental conditions for test
 ISO 18192-2:2010 Part 2: Nucleus replacements
 ISO 18192-3:2017 Part 3: Impingement-wear testing and corresponding environmental conditions for test of lumbar prostheses under adverse kinematic conditions
 ISO/TR 18196:2016 Nanotechnologies – Measurement technique matrix for the characterization of nano-objects
 ISO 18215:2015 Ships and marine technology - Vessel machinery operations in polar waters - Guidelines
 ISO 18232:2006 Health Informatics – Messages and communication – Format of length limited globally unique string identifiers
 ISO/TS 18234 Intelligent transport systems – Traffic and travel information via transport protocol experts group, generation 1 (TPEG1) binary data format
 ISO/TS 18234-1:2013 Part 1: Introduction, numbering and versions (TPEG1-INV)
 ISO/TS 18234-2:2013 Part 2: Syntax, semantics and framing structure (TPEG1-SSF)
 ISO/TS 18234-3:2013 Part 3: Service and network information (TPEG1-SNI)
 ISO/TS 18234-4:2006 Part 4: Road Traffic Message (RTM) application
 ISO/TS 18234-5:2006 Part 5: Public Transport Information (PTI) application
 ISO/TS 18234-6:2006 Part 6: Location referencing applications
 ISO/TS 18234-7:2013 Part 7: Parking information (TPEG1-PKI)
 ISO/TS 18234-8:2012 Part 8: Congestion and Travel Time application (TPEG1-CTT)
 ISO/TS 18234-9:2013 Part 9: Traffic event compact (TPEG1-TEC)
 ISO/TS 18234-10:2013 Part 10: Conditional access information (TPEG1-CAI)
 ISO/TS 18234-11:2013 Part 11: Location Referencing Container (TPEG1-LRC)
 ISO 18241:2016 Cardiovascular implants and extracorporeal systems – Cardiopulmonary bypass systems – Venous bubble traps
 ISO 18242:2016 Cardiovascular implants and extracorporeal systems – Centrifugal blood pumps
 ISO 18245:2003 Retail financial services – Merchant category codes
 ISO 18259:2014 Ophthalmic optics – Contact lens care products – Method to assess contact lens care products with contact lenses in a lens case, challenged with bacterial and fungal organisms
 ISO/IEC TR 18268:2013 Identification cards – Contactless integrated circuit cards – Proximity cards – Multiple PICCs in a single PCD field
 ISO 18295 Customer contact centres
 ISO 18295-1:2017 Part 1: Requirements for customer contact centres
 ISO 18295-2:2017 Part 2: Requirements for clients using the services of customer contact centres
 ISO/IEC 18305:2016 Information technology - Real time locating systems - Test and evaluation of localization and tracking systems
 ISO/TR 18307:2001 Health informatics – Interoperability and compatibility in messaging and communication standards – Key characteristics
 ISO 18308:2011 Health informatics – Requirements for an electronic health record architecture
 ISO 18312 Mechanical vibration and shock – Measurement of vibration power flow from machines into connected support structures
 ISO 18312-1:2012 Part 1: Direct method
 ISO 18312-2:2012 Part 2: Indirect method
 ISO/TR 18317:2017 Intelligent transport systems – Pre-emption of ITS communication networks for disaster and emergency communication – Use case scenarios
 ISO 18322:2017 Space systems – General management requirements for space test centres
 ISO/IEC 18328 Identification cards – ICC-managed devices
 ISO/IEC 18328-1:2015 Part 1: General framework
 ISO/IEC 18328-2:2015 Part 2: Physical characteristics and test methods for cards with devices
 ISO/IEC 18328-3:2016 Part 3: Organization, security and commands for interchange
 ISO/TS 18339:2015 Endotherapy devices – Eyepiece cap and light guide connector
 ISO/TS 18340:2015 Endoscopes – Trocar pins, trocar sleeves and endotherapy devices for use with trocar sleeves
 ISO/TS 18344:2016 Effectiveness of paper deacidification processes
 ISO 18365:2013 Hydrometry – Selection, establishment and operation of a gauging station
 ISO/IEC 18367:2016 Information technology - Security techniques - Cryptographic algorithms and security mechanisms conformance testing
 ISO 18369 Ophthalmic optics - Contact lenses
 ISO 18369-1:2017 Part 1: Vocabulary, classification system and recommendations for labelling specifications
 ISO 18369-2:2017 Part 2: Tolerances
 ISO 18369-3:2017 Part 3: Measurement methods
 ISO 18369-4:2017 Part 4: Physicochemical properties of contact lens materials
 ISO/IEC 18370 Information technology - Security techniques - Blind digital signatures
 ISO/IEC 18370-1:2016 Part 1: General
 ISO/IEC 18370-2:2016 Part 2: Discrete logarithm based mechanisms
 ISO/IEC 18372:2004 Information technology – RapidIO interconnect specification
 ISO/TR 18476:2017 Ophthalmic optics and instruments – Free form technology – Spectacle lenses and measurement
 ISO/IEC 18384 Information technology - Reference Architecture for Service Oriented Architecture (SOA RA)
 ISO/IEC 18384-1:2016 Part 1: Terminology and concepts for SOA
 ISO/IEC 18384-2:2016 Part 2: Reference Architecture for SOA Solutions
 ISO/IEC 18384-3:2016 Part 3: Service Oriented Architecture ontology
 ISO 18385:2016 Minimizing the risk of human DNA contamination in products used to collect, store and analyze biological material for forensic purposes – Requirements
 ISO 18388:2016 Technical product documentation (TPD) – Relief grooves – Types and dimensioning
 ISO 18391:2016 Geometrical product specifications (GPS) - Population specification
 ISO/TR 18401:2017 Nanotechnologies - Plain language explanation of selected terms from the ISO/IEC 80004 series
 ISO 18404:2015 Quantitative methods in process improvement - Six Sigma - Competencies for key personnel and their organizations in relation to Six Sigma and Lean implementation
 ISO 18405:2017 Underwater acoustics - Terminology
 ISO 18406:2017 Underwater acoustics – Measurement of radiated underwater sound from percussive pile driving
 ISO 18414:2006 Acceptance sampling procedures by attributes - Accept-zero sampling system based on credit principle for controlling outgoing quality
 ISO 18415:2017 Cosmetics – Microbiology – Detection of specified and non-specified microorganisms
 ISO 18416:2015 Cosmetics – Microbiology – Detection of Candida albicans
 ISO 18431 Mechanical vibration and shock – Signal processing
 ISO 18431-1:2005 Part 1: General introduction
 ISO 18431-2:2004 Part 2: Time domain windows for Fourier Transform analysis
 ISO 18431-3:2014 Part 3: Methods of time-frequency analysis
 ISO 18431-4:2007 Part 4: Shock-response spectrum analysis
 ISO 18434 Condition monitoring and diagnostics of machines – Thermography
 ISO 18434-1:2008 Part 1: General procedures
 ISO 18436 Condition monitoring and diagnostics of machines – Requirements for qualification and assessment of personnel
 ISO 18436-1:2012 Part 1: Requirements for assessment bodies and the assessment process
 ISO 18436-2:2014 Part 2: Vibration condition monitoring and diagnostics
 ISO 18436-3:2012 Part 3: Requirements for training bodies and the training process
 ISO 18436-4:2014 Part 4: Field lubricant analysis
 ISO 18436-5:2012 Part 5: Lubricant laboratory technician/analyst
 ISO 18436-6:2014 Part 6: Acoustic emission
 ISO 18436-7:2014 Part 7: Thermography
 ISO 18436-8:2013 Part 8: Ultrasound
 ISO 18437 Mechanical vibration and shock – Characterization of the dynamic mechanical properties of visco-elastic materials
 ISO 18437-1:2012 Part 1: Principles and guidelines
 ISO 18437-2:2005 Part 2: Resonance method
 ISO 18437-3:2005 Part 3: Cantilever shear beam method
 ISO 18437-4:2008 Part 4: Dynamic stiffness method
 ISO 18437-5:2011 Part 5: Poisson ratio based on comparison between measurements and finite element analysis
 ISO/IEC 18450:2013 Information technology - Telecommunications and information exchange between systems - Web Services Description Language (WSDL) for CSTA Phase III
 ISO 18451 Pigments, dyestuffs and extenders – Terminology
 ISO 18451-1:2015 Part 1: General terms
 ISO 18457:2016 Biomimetics – Biomimetic materials, structures and components
 ISO 18458:2015 Biomimetics – Terminology, concepts and methodology
 ISO 18459:2015 Biomimetics – Biomimetic structural optimization
 ISO 18461:2016 International museum statistics
 ISO 18465:2017 Microbiology of the food chain - Quantitative determination of emetic toxin (cereulide) using LC-MS/MS
 ISO/IEC 18477 Information technology - Scalable compression and coding of continuous-tone still images
 ISO/IEC 18477-1:2015 Part 1: Scalable compression and coding of continuous-tone still images
 ISO/IEC 18477-2:2016 Part 2: Coding of high dynamic range images
 ISO/IEC 18477-3:2015 Part 3: Box file format
 ISO/IEC 18477-6:2016 Part 6: IDR Integer Coding
 ISO/IEC 18477-7:2017 Part 7: HDR Floating-Point Coding
 ISO/IEC 18477-8:2016 Part 8: Lossless and near-lossless coding
 ISO/IEC 18477-9:2016 Part 9: Alpha channel coding
 ISO 18490:2015 Non-destructive testing – Evaluation of vision acuity of NDT personnel
 ISO 18495 Intelligent transport systems – Commercial freight – Automotive visibility in the distribution supply chain
 ISO 18495-1:2016 Part 1: Architecture and data definitions
 ISO/IEC TS 18508:2015 Information technology - Additional Parallel Features in Fortran
 ISO 18513:2003 Tourism services - Hotels and other types of tourism accommodation - Terminology
 ISO/TR 18529:2000 Ergonomics – Ergonomics of human-system interaction – Human-centred lifecycle process descriptions
 ISO/TS 18530:2014 Health Informatics – Automatic identification and data capture marking and labelling – Subject of care and individual provider identification
 ISO/TR 18532:2009 Guidance on the application of statistical methods to quality and to industrial standardization
 ISO 18541 Road vehicles – Standardized access to automotive repair and maintenance information (RMI)
 ISO 18542 Road vehicles – Standardized repair and maintenance information (RMI) terminology
 ISO 18542-1:2012 Part 1: General information and use case definition
 ISO 18542-2:2014 Part 2: Standardized process implementation requirements, Registration Authority
 ISO 18562 Biocompatibility evaluation of breathing gas pathways in healthcare applications
 ISO 18562-1:2017 Part 1: Evaluation and testing within a risk management process
 ISO 18562-2:2017 Part 2: Tests for emissions of particulate matter
 ISO 18562-3:2017 Part 3: Tests for emissions of volatile organic compounds (VOCs)
 ISO 18562-4:2017 Part 4: Tests for leachables in condensate
 ISO 18564:2016 Machinery for forestry – Noise test code
 ISO/IEC 18584:2015 Information technology – Identification cards – Conformance test requirements for on-card biometric comparison applications
 ISO 18587:2017 Translation services - Post-editing of machine translation output - Requirements
 ISO 18589 Measurement of radioactivity in the environment - Soil
 ISO 18589-1:2005 Part 1: General guidelines and definitions
 ISO 18589-2:2015 Part 2: Guidance for the selection of the sampling strategy, sampling and pre-treatment of samples
 ISO 18589-3:2015 Part 3: Test method of gamma-emitting radionuclides using gamma-ray spectrometry
 ISO 18589-4:2009 Part 4: Measurement of plutonium isotopes (plutonium 238 and plutonium 239 + 240) by alpha spectrometry
 ISO 18589-5:2009 Part 5: Measurement of strontium 90
 ISO 18589-6:2009 Part 6: Measurement of gross alpha and gross beta activities
 ISO 18589-7:2013 Part 7: In situ measurement of gamma-emitting radionuclides
 ISO 18593:2004 Microbiology of food and animal feeding stuffs – Horizontal methods for sampling techniques from surfaces using contact plates and swabs
 ISO/IEC 18598:2016 Information technology - Automated infrastructure management (AIM) systems - Requirements, data exchange and applications
 ISO 18600:2015 Textile machinery and accessories – Web roller cards – Terms and definitions
 ISO 18601:2013 Packaging and the environment - General requirements for the use of ISO standards in the field of packaging and the environment
 ISO 18602:2013 Packaging and the environment—Optimization of the packaging system
 ISO 18603:2013 Packaging and the environment—Reuse
 ISO 18604:2013 Packaging and the environment—Material recycling
 ISO 18605:2013 Packaging and the environment—Energy recovery
 ISO 18606:2013 Packaging and the environment—Organic recycling
 ISO/TS 18614:2016 Packaging - Label material - Required information for ordering and specifying self-adhesive labels 
 ISO 18619:2015 Image technology colour management - Black point compensation
 ISO 18626:2017 Information and documentation - Interlibrary Loan Transactions
 ISO 18629 Industrial automation systems and integration – Process specification language
 ISO/TR 18637:2016 Nanotechnologies – Overview of available frameworks for the development of occupational exposure limits and bands for nano-objects and their aggregates and agglomerates (NOAAs)
 ISO/TR 18638:2017 Health informatics – Guidance on health information privacy education in healthcare organizations
 ISO 18649:2004 Mechanical vibration – Evaluation of measurement results from dynamic tests and investigations on bridges
 ISO 18650 Building construction machinery and equipment – Concrete mixers
 ISO 18650-1:2004 Part 1: Vocabulary and general specifications
 ISO/IEC TS 18661 Information technology - Programming languages, their environments, and system software interfaces - Floating-point extensions for C
 ISO/IEC TS 18661-1:2014 Part 1: Binary floating-point arithmetic
 ISO/IEC TS 18661-2:2015 Part 2: Decimal floating-point arithmetic
 ISO/IEC TS 18661-3:2015 Part 3: Interchange and extended types
 ISO/IEC TS 18661-4:2015 Part 4: Supplementary functions
 ISO/IEC TS 18661-5:2016 Part 5: Supplementary attributes
 ISO 18662 Traditional Chinese medicine - Vocabulary
 ISO 18662-1:2017 Part 1: Chinese Materia Medica
 ISO 18665:2015 Traditional Chinese medicine – Herbal decoction apparatus
 ISO 18666:2015 Traditional Chinese medicine – General requirements of moxibustion devices
 ISO 18682:2016 Intelligent transport systems – External hazard detection and notification systems – Basic requirements
 ISO 18739:2016 Dentistry - Vocabulary of process chain for CAD/CAM systems
 ISO 18743:2015 Microbiology of the food chain – Detection of Trichinella larvae in meat by artificial digestion method
 ISO 18744:2016 Microbiology of the food chain – Detection and enumeration of Cryptosporidium and Giardia in fresh leafy green vegetables and berry fruits
 ISO/IEC 18745 Information technology – Test methods for machine readable travel documents (MRTD) and associated devices
 ISO/IEC 18745-1:2014 Part 1: Physical test methods for passport books (durability)
 ISO/IEC 18745-2:2016 Part 2: Test methods for the contactless interface
 ISO 18746:2016 Traditional Chinese medicine – Sterile intradermal acupuncture needles for single use
 ISO/TS 18750:2015 Intelligent transport systems – Cooperative systems – Definition of a global concept for Local Dynamic Maps
 ISO/PAS 18761:2013 Use and handling of medical devices covered by the scope of ISO/TC 84 – Risk assessment on mucocutaneous blood exposure
 ISO 18774:2015 Securities and related financial instruments – Financial Instrument Short Name (FISN)
 ISO 18775:2008 Veneers – Terms and definitions, determination of physical characteristics and tolerances
 ISO 18777:2005 Transportable liquid oxygen systems for medical use – Particular requirements
 ISO 18778:2005 Respiratory equipment – Infant monitors – Particular requirements
 ISO 18788:2015 Management system for private security operations – Requirements with guidance for use
 ISO/TS 18790 Health informatics – Profiling framework and classification for Traditional Medicine informatics standards development
 ISO/TS 18790-1:2015 Part 1: Traditional Chinese Medicine
 ISO/IEC 18809:2000 Information technology – 8 mm wide magnetic tape cartridge for information interchange – Helical scan recording AIT-1 with MIC format
 ISO/IEC 18810:2001 Information technology – 8 mm wide magnetic tape cartridge for information interchange – Helical scan recording AIT-2 with MIC format
 ISO 18812:2003 Health informatics – Clinical analyser interfaces to laboratory information systems – Use profiles
 ISO/IEC TS 18822:2015 Programming languages - C++ - File System Technical Specification
 ISO/TS 18827:2017 Nanotechnologies – Electron spin resonance (ESR) as a method for measuring reactive oxygen species (ROS) generated by metal oxide nanomaterials
 ISO 18829:2017 Document management - Assessing ECM/EDRM implementations - Trustworthiness
 ISO 18831:2016 Clothing – Digital fittings – Attributes of virtual garments
 ISO 18835:2015 Inhalational anaesthesia systems – Draw-over anaesthetic systems
 ISO/IEC 18836:2001 Information technology – 8 mm wide magnetic tape cartridge for information interchange – Helical scan recording – MammothTape-2 format
 ISO 18841:2018 Interpreting services — General requirements and recommendations
 ISO/TR 18845:2017 Dentistry - Test methods for machining accuracy of computer-aided milling machines
 ISO/TS 18867:2015 Microbiology of the food chain – Polymerase chain reaction (PCR) for the detection of food-borne pathogens – Detection of pathogenic Yersinia enterocolitica and Yersinia pseudotuberculosis
 ISO 18875:2015 Coalbed methane exploration and development – Terms and definitions
 ISO/TS 18876 Industrial automation systems and integration - Integration of industrial data for exchange, access and sharing
 ISO/TS 18876-1:2003 Part 1: Architecture overview and description
 ISO/TS 18876-2:2003 Part 2: Integration and mapping methodology
 ISO 18878:2013 Mobile elevating work platforms – Operator (driver) training
 ISO/IEC/IEEE 18880:2015 Information technology – Ubiquitous green community control network protocol
 ISO/IEC/IEEE 18881:2016 Information technology – Ubiquitous green community control network – Control and management
 ISO/IEC/IEEE 18882:2017 Information technology – Telecommunications and information exchange between systems – Ubiquitous green community control network: Heterogeneous networks convergence and scalability
 ISO/IEC/IEEE 18883:2016 Information technology – Ubiquitous green community control network – Security
 ISO 18913:2012 Imaging materials - Permanence - Vocabulary
 ISO 18921:2008 Imaging materials - Compact discs (CD-ROM) - Method for estimating the life expectancy based on the effects of temperature and relative humidity
 ISO 18925:2013 Imaging materials - Optical disc media - Storage practices
 ISO 18926:2012 Imaging materials - Information stored on magneto-optical (MO) discs - Method for estimating the life expectancy based on the effects of temperature and relative humidity
 ISO 18927:2013 Imaging materials - Recordable compact disc systems - Method for estimating the life expectancy based on the effects of temperature and relative humidity
 ISO 18933:2012 Imaging materials – Magnetic tape – Care and handling practices for extended usage 
 ISO 18938:2014 Imaging materials - Optical discs - Care and handling for extended storage

ISO 19000 – ISO 19999
 ISO 19001:2013 In vitro diagnostic medical devices – Information supplied by the manufacturer with in vitro diagnostic reagents for staining in biology
 ISO 19005 Document management – Electronic document file format for long-term preservation
 ISO/TS 19006:2016 Nanotechnologies – 5-(and 6)-Chloromethyl-2’,7’ Dichloro-dihydrofluorescein diacetate (CM-H2DCF-DA) assay for evaluating nanoparticle-induced intracellular reactive oxygen species (ROS) production in RAW 264.7 macrophage cell line
 ISO 19011:2011 Guidelines for auditing management systems
 ISO 19014 Earth Moving Machinery - Functional Safety
 ISO 19017:2015 Guidance for gamma spectrometry measurement of radioactive waste
 ISO 19018:2004 Ships and marine technology - Terms, abbreviations, graphical symbols and concepts on navigation
 ISO 19019:2005 Sea-going vessels and marine technology - Instructions for planning, carrying out and reporting sea trials
 ISO 19020:2017 Microbiology of the food chain – Horizontal method for the immunoenzymatic detection of staphylococcal enterotoxins in foodstuffs
 ISO/TR 19024:2016 Evaluation of CPB devices relative to their capabilities of reducing the transmission of gaseous microemboli (GME) to a patient during cardiopulmonary bypass
 ISO 19028:2016 Accessible design - Information contents, figuration and display methods of tactile guide maps
 ISO/TS 19036:2006 Microbiology of food and animal feeding stuffs – Guidelines for the estimation of measurement uncertainty for quantitative determinations
 ISO/TR 19038:2005 Banking and related financial services – Triple DEA – Modes of operation – Implementation guidelines
 ISO 19045:2015 Ophthalmic optics – Contact lens care products – Method for evaluating Acanthamoeba encystment by contact lens care products
 ISO 19054:2005 Rail systems for supporting medical equipment
 ISO/TR 19057:2017 Nanotechnologies – Use and application of acellular in vitro tests and methodologies to assess nanomaterial biodurability
 ISO/IEC 19058:2001 Information technology – Telecommunications and information exchange between systems – Broadband Private Integrated Services Network – Inter-exchange signalling protocol – Generic functional protocol
 ISO/IEC TR 19075 Information technology database languages — Guidance for the use of database language SQL
 ISO 19079:2016 Intelligent transport systems – Communications access for land mobiles (CALM) – 6LoWPAN networking
 ISO 19080:2016 Intelligent transport systems – Communications access for land mobiles (CALM) – CoAP facility
 ISO/TR 19083 Intelligent transport systems – Emergency evacuation and disaster response and recovery
 ISO/TR 19083-1:2016 Part 1: Framework and concept of operation
 ISO/IEC 19086 Information technology - Cloud computing - Service level agreement (SLA) framework
 ISO/IEC 19086-1:2016 Part 1: Overview and concepts
 ISO/IEC 19086-3:2017 Part 3: Core conformance requirements
 ISO/TS 19091:2017 Intelligent transport systems – Cooperative ITS – Using V2I and I2V communications for applications related to signalized intersections
 ISO 19092:2008 Financial services – Biometrics – Security framework
 ISO/IEC 19099:2014 Information technology - Virtualization Management Specification
 ISO 19101 Geographic information – Reference model
 ISO 19101-1:2014 Part 1: Fundamentals
 ISO/TS 19101-2:2008 Part 2: Imagery
 ISO/TS 19103:2015 Geographic information – Conceptual schema language
 ISO/TS 19104:2016 Geographic information – Terminology
 ISO 19105:2000 Geographic information – Conformance and testing
 ISO 19106:2004 Geographic information – Profiles
 ISO 19107:2003 Geographic information – Spatial schema
 ISO 19108:2002 Geographic information – Temporal schema
 ISO 19109:2015 Geographic information – Rules for application schema
 ISO 19110:2016 Geographic information – Methodology for feature cataloguing
 ISO 19111:2007 Geographic information – Spatial referencing by coordinates
 ISO 19111-2:2009 Part 2: Extension for parametric values
 ISO 19112:2003 Geographic information – Spatial referencing by geographic identifiers
 ISO 19113:2002 Geographic information – Quality principles [Withdrawn: replaced by ISO 19157:2013]
 ISO 19114:2003 Geographic information – Quality evaluation procedures [Withdrawn: replaced by ISO 19157:2013]
 ISO 19115 Geographic information – Metadata
 ISO 19115-1:2014 Part 1: Fundamentals
 ISO 19115-2:2009 Part 2: Extensions for imagery and gridded data
 ISO/TS 19115-3:2016 Part 3: XML schema implementation for fundamental concepts
 ISO 19116:2004 Geographic information – Positioning services
 ISO 19117:2012 Geographic information – Portrayal
 ISO 19118:2011 Geographic information – Encoding
 ISO 19119:2016 Geographic information – Services
 ISO/TR 19120:2001 Geographic information – Functional standards
 ISO/TR 19121:2000 Geographic information – Imagery and gridded data
 ISO/TR 19122:2004 Geographic information / Geomatics – Qualification and certification of personnel
 ISO 19123:2005 Geographic information – Schema for coverage geometry and functions
 ISO 19125 Geographic information – Simple feature access
 ISO 19126:2009 Geographic information – Feature concept dictionaries and registers
 ISO/TS 19127:2005 Geographic information – Geodetic codes and parameters
 ISO 19128:2005 Geographic information – Web map server interface
 ISO/TS 19129:2009 Geographic information – Imagery, gridded and coverage data framework
 ISO/TS 19130:2010 Geographic information – Imagery sensor models for geopositioning
 ISO/TS 19130-2:2014 Part 2: SAR, InSAR, lidar and sonar
 ISO 19131:2007 Geographic information – Data product specifications
 ISO 19132:2007 Geographic information – Location-based services – Reference model
 ISO 19133:2005 Geographic information – Location-based services – Tracking and navigation
 ISO 19134:2007 Geographic information – Location-based services – Multimodal routing and navigation
 ISO 19135 Geographic information – Procedures for item registration
 ISO 19135-1:2015 Part 1: Fundamentals
 ISO/TS 19135-2:2012 Part 2: XML schema implementation
 ISO 19136:2007 Geographic information – Geography Markup Language (GML)
 ISO 19136-2:2015 Part 2: Extended schemas and encoding rules
 ISO 19137:2007 Geographic information – Core profile of the spatial schema
 ISO/TS 19138:2006 Geographic information – Data quality measures [Withdrawn: replaced by ISO 19157:2013]
 ISO/TS 19139:2007 Geographic information – Metadata – XML schema implementation
 ISO/TS 19139-2:2012 Part 2: Extensions for imagery and gridded data
 ISO 19141:2008 Geographic information – Schema for moving features
 ISO 19142:2010 Geographic information – Web Feature Service
 ISO 19143:2010 Geographic information – Filter encoding
 ISO 19144 Geographic information – Classification systems
 ISO 19144-1:2009 Part 1: Classification system structure
 ISO 19144-2:2012 Part 2: Land Cover Meta Language (LCML)
 ISO 19145:2013 Geographic information – Registry of representations of geographic point location 
 ISO 19146:2010 Geographic information – Cross-domain vocabularies
 ISO 19147:2015 Geographic information – Transfer Nodes
 ISO 19148:2012 Geographic information – Linear referencing
 ISO 19149:2011 Geographic information – Rights expression language for geographic information - GeoREL
 ISO 19150 Geographic information – Ontology
 ISO/TS 19150-1:2012 Part 1: Framework
 ISO 19150-2:2015 Part 2: Rules for developing ontologies in the Web Ontology Language (OWL)
 ISO 19152:2012 Geographic information – Land Administration Domain Model (LADM)
 ISO 19153:2014 Geospatial Digital Rights Management Reference Model (GeoDRM RM)
 ISO 19154:2014 Geographic information – Ubiquitous public access – Reference model
 ISO 19155:2012 Geographic information – Place Identifier (PI) architecture
 ISO 19155-2:2017 Part 2: Place Identifier (PI) linking
 ISO 19156 Geographic information - Observations and measurements
 ISO 19157:2013 Geographic information – Data quality
 ISO/TS 19157-2:2016 Part 2: XML schema implementation
 ISO/TS 19158:2012 Geographic information – Quality assurance of data supply
 ISO/TS 19159 Geographic information – Calibration and validation of remote sensing imagery sensors and data
 ISO/TS 19159-1:2014 Part 1: Optical sensors
 ISO/TS 19159-2:2016 Part 2: Lidar
 ISO 19160 Addressing
 ISO 19160-1:2015 Part 1: Conceptual model
 ISO 19162:2015 Geographic information – Well-known text representation of coordinate reference systems
 ISO/TS 19163 Geographic information – Content components and encoding rules for imagery and gridded data
 ISO/TS 19163-1:2016 Part 1: Content model
 ISO/TR 19201:2013 Mechanical vibration – Methodology for selecting appropriate machinery vibration standards
 ISO 19204:2017 Soil quality - Procedure for site-specific ecological risk assessment of soil contamination (soil quality TRIAD approach)
 ISO 19213:2017 Implants for surgery – Test methods of material for use as a cortical bone model
 ISO/IEC TS 19216:2018 Programming Languages – C++ Extensions for Networking
 ISO/IEC TS 19217:2015 Information technology - Programming languages - C++ Extensions for concepts
 ISO/TS 19218 Medical devices – Hierarchical coding structure for adverse events
 ISO/TS 19218-1:2011 Part 1: Event-type codes
 ISO/TS 19218-2:2012 Part 2: Evaluation codes
 ISO/TR 19231:2014 Health informatics – Survey of mHealth projects in low and middle income countries (LMIC)
 ISO 19233 Implants for surgery – Orthopaedic joint prosthesis
 ISO 19233-1:2017 Part 1: Procedure for producing parametric 3D bone models from CT data of the knee
 ISO/TR 19234:2016 Hydrometry – Low cost baffle solution to aid fish passage at triangular profile weirs that conform to ISO 4360
 ISO 19238:2014 Radiological protection - Performance criteria for service laboratories performing biological dosimetry by cytogenetics
 ISO/TR 19244:2014 Guidance on transition periods for standards developed by ISO/TC 84 – Devices for administration of medicinal products and catheters
 ISO 19250:2010 Water quality – Detection of Salmonella spp.
 ISO/TS 19256:2016 Health informatics – Requirements for medicinal product dictionary systems for health care
 ISO 19262:2015 Photography - Archiving Systems - Vocabulary
 ISO/TR 19263 Photography - Archiving systems
 ISO/TR 19263-1:2017 Part 1: Best practices for digital image capture of cultural heritage material
 ISO/TS 19264 Photography - Archiving systems - Image quality analysis
 ISO/TS 19264-1:2017 Part 1: Reflective originals
 ISO 19289:2015 Air quality – Meteorology – Siting classifications for surface observing stations on land
 ISO/TS 19299:2015 Electronic fee collection – Security framework
 ISO/TR 19300:2015 Graphic technology – Guidelines for the use of standards for print media production
 ISO/TS 19321:2015 Intelligent transport systems – Cooperative ITS – Dictionary of in-vehicle information (IVI) data structures
 ISO/TS 19337:2016 Nanotechnologies – Characteristics of working suspensions of nano-objects for in vitro assays to evaluate inherent nano-object toxicity
 ISO 19343:2017 Microbiology of the food chain – Detection and quantification of histamine in fish and fishery products – HPLC method
 ISO 19361:2017 Measurement of radioactivity - Determination of beta emitters activities - Test method using liquid scintillation counting
 ISO/IEC 19369:2014 Information technology – Telecommunications and information exchange between systems – NFCIP-2 test methods 
 ISO/IEC 19395:2015 Information technology - Sustainability for and by information technology - Smart data centre resource monitoring and control
 ISO 19403 Paints and varnishes – Wettability
 ISO 19403-1:2017 Part 1: Terminology and general principles
 ISO 19403-2:2017 Part 2: Determination of the surface free energy of solid surfaces by measuring the contact angle
 ISO 19403-3:2017 Part 3: Determination of the surface tension of liquids using the pendant drop method
 ISO 19403-4:2017 Part 4: Determination of the polar and dispersive fractions of the surface tension of liquids from an interfacial tension
 ISO 19403-5:2017 Part 5: Determination of the polar and dispersive fractions of the surface tension of liquids from contact angles measurements on a solid with only a disperse contribution to its surface energy
 ISO 19403-6:2017 Part 6: Measurement of dynamic contact angle
 ISO 19403-7:2017 Part 7: Measurement of the contact angle on a tilt stage (roll-off angle)
 ISO/TS 19408:2015 Footwear – Sizing – Vocabulary and terminology
 ISO 19439 Enterprise integration – Framework for enterprise modelling
 ISO 19440 Enterprise integration – Constructs for enterprise modelling
ISO 19443:2018 Quality management in the supply chain for the Nuclear industry, based on ISO9001, to optimize safety and quality in supplying products and services (ITNS)
 ISO 19444 Document management - XML Forms Data Format
 ISO 19444-1:2016 Part 1: Use of ISO 32000-2 (XFDF 3.0)
 ISO 19445:2016 Graphic technology - Metadata for graphic arts workflow - XMP metadata for image and document proofing
 ISO/IEC TR 19446:2015 Differences between the driving licences based on the ISO/IEC 18013 series and the European Union specifications
 ISO/IEC 19459:2001 Information technology – Telecommunications and information exchange between systems – Private Integrated Services Network – Specification, functional model and information flows – Single Step Call Transfer Supplementary Service
 ISO/IEC 19460:2003 Information technology – Telecommunications and information exchange between systems – Private Integrated Services Network – Inter-exchange signalling protocol – Single Step Call Transfer supplementary service
 ISO/IEC 19464:2014 Information technology – Advanced Message Queuing Protocol (AMQP) v1.0 specification
 ISO 19465:2017 Traditional Chinese medicine - Categories of traditional Chinese medicine (TCM) clinical terminological systems
 ISO 19467:2017 Thermal performance of windows and doors - Determination of solar heat gain coefficient using solar simulator
 ISO/CIE 19476:2014 Characterization of the performance of illuminance meters and luminance meters
 ISO/TR 19480:2005 Polyethylene pipes and fittings for the supply of gaseous fuels or water – Training and assessment of fusion operators
 ISO 19496 Vitreous and porcelain enamels - Terminology
 ISO 19496-1:2017 Part 1: Terms and definitions
 ISO 19496-2:2017 Part 2: Visual representations and descriptions
 ISO/TR 19498:2015 Ophthalmic optics and instruments – Correlation of optotypes
 ISO/IEC 19500 Information technology - Object Management Group - Common Object Request Broker Architecture (CORBA)
 ISO/IEC 19500-1:2012 Part 1: Interfaces
 ISO/IEC 19500-2:2012 Part 2: Interoperability
 ISO/IEC 19500-3:2012 Part 3: Components
 ISO/IEC 19501 Information technology – Open Distributed Processing – Unified Modeling Language (UML) Version 1.4.2
 ISO/IEC 19502 Information technology – Meta Object Facility (MOF)
 ISO/IEC 19503 Information technology – XML Metadata Interchange (XMI)
 ISO/IEC 19505 Information technology - Object Management Group Unified Modeling Language (OMG UML)
 ISO/IEC 19505-1:2012 Part 1: Infrastructure
 ISO/IEC 19505-2:2012 Part 2: Superstructure
 ISO/IEC 19506:2012 Information technology—Object Management Group Architecture-Driven Modernization (ADM) - Knowledge Discovery Meta-Model (KDM)
 ISO/IEC 19507:2012 Information technology - Object Management Group Object Constraint Language (OCL)
 ISO/IEC 19508:2014 Information technology - Object Management Group Meta Object Facility (MOF) Core
 ISO/IEC 19509:2014 Information technology - Object Management Group XML Metadata Interchange (XMI)
 ISO/IEC 19510:2013 Information technology - Object Management Group Business Process Model and Notation
 ISO/IEC 19514:2017 Information technology - Object management group systems modeling language (OMG SysML)
 ISO/IEC 19516:2020 Information technology — Object management group — Interface definition language (IDL) 4.2 
 ISO/IEC TR 19566 Information technology - JPEG Systems
 ISO/IEC TR 19566-1:2016 Part 1: Packaging of information using codestreams and file formats
 ISO/IEC TR 19566-2:2016 Part 2: Transport mechanisms and packaging
 ISO/IEC TS 19568:2017 Programming Languages - C++ Extensions for Library Fundamentals
 ISO/IEC TS 19570:2018 Programming Languages – Technical Specification for C++ Extensions for Parallelism
 ISO/IEC TS 19571:2016 Programming Languages - Technical specification for C++ extensions for concurrency
 ISO/TS 19590:2017 Nanotechnologies – Size distribution and concentration of inorganic nanoparticles in aqueous media via single particle inductively coupled plasma mass spectrometry
 ISO/IEC 19592 Information technology - Security techniques - Secret sharing
 ISO/IEC 19592-1:2016 Part 1: General
 ISO 19600 Compliance management systems - Guidelines
 ISO/TR 19601:2017 Nanotechnologies – Aerosol generation for air exposure studies of nano-objects and their aggregates and agglomerates (NOAA)
 ISO 19611:2017 Traditional Chinese medicine – Air extraction cupping device
 ISO 19614:2017 Traditional Chinese medicine – Pulse graph force transducer
 ISO/IEC 19637:2016 Information technology – Sensor network testing framework
 ISO/TR 19639:2015 Electronic fee collection – Investigation of EFC standards for common payment schemes for multi-modal transport services
 ISO 19649:2017 Mobile robots - Vocabulary
 ISO/TR 19664:2017 Human response to vibration – Guidance and terminology for instrumentation and equipment for the assessment of daily vibration exposure at the workplace according to the requirements of health and safety
 ISO/IEC 19678:2015 Information Technology - BIOS Protection Guidelines
 ISO 19709 Transport packaging - Small load container systems
 ISO 19709-1:2016 Part 1: Common requirements and test methods
 ISO/TS 19709-2:2016 Part 2: Column Stackable System (CSS)
 ISO/TS 19709-3:2016 Part 3: Bond Stackable System (BSS)
 ISO/TR 19716:2016 Nanotechnologies – Characterization of cellulose nanocrystals
 ISO 19719:2010 Machine tools - Work holding chucks - Vocabulary
 ISO 19720 Building construction machinery and equipment – Plants for the preparation of concrete and mortar
 ISO 19720-1:2017 Part 1: Terminology and commercial specifications
 ISO/TR 19727:2017 Medical devices – Pump tube spallation test – General procedure
 ISO 19731:2017 Digital analytics and web analyses for purposes of market, opinion and social research - Vocabulary and service requirements
 ISO/IEC 19752 Information technology – Method for the determination of toner cartridge yield for monochromatic electrophotographic printers and multi-function devices that contain printer components
 ISO/IEC TR 19755:2003 Information technology - Programming languages, their environments and system software interfaces - Object finalization for programming language COBOL
 ISO/IEC 19756:2011 Information technology - Topic Maps - Constraint Language (TMCL)
 ISO/IEC 19757 Information technology – Document Schema Definition Languages (DSDL)
 ISO/IEC 19757-2:2008 Part 2: Regular-grammar-based validation – RELAX NG
 ISO/IEC 19757-3:2016 Part 3: Rule-based validation – Schematron
 ISO/IEC 19757-4:2006 Part 4: Namespace-based Validation Dispatching Language (NVDL)
 ISO/IEC 19757-5:2011 Part 5: Extensible Datatypes
 ISO/IEC 19757-7:2009 Part 7: Character Repertoire Description Language (CREPDL)
 ISO/IEC 19757-8:2008 Part 8: Document Semantics Renaming Language (DSRL)
 ISO/IEC 19757-11:2011 Part 11: Schema association
 ISO/IEC TR 19758:2003 Information technology - Document description and processing languages - DSSSL library for complex compositions
 ISO/IEC TR 19759:2015 Software Engineering - Guide to the software engineering body of knowledge (SWEBOK)
 ISO/IEC 19761:2011 Software engineering - COSMIC: a functional size measurement method
 ISO/IEC 19762:2016 Information technology - Automatic identification and data capture (AIDC) techniques - Harmonized vocabulary
 ISO/IEC 19763 Information technology - Metamodel framework for interoperability (MFI)
 ISO/IEC 19763-1:2015 Part 1: Framework
 ISO/IEC 19763-3:2010 Part 3: Metamodel for ontology registration
 ISO/IEC 19763-5:2015 Part 5: Metamodel for process model registration
 ISO/IEC 19763-6:2015 Part 6: Registry Summary
 ISO/IEC 19763-7:2015 Part 7: Metamodel for service model registration
 ISO/IEC 19763-8:2015 Part 8: Metamodel for role and goal model registration
 ISO/IEC TR 19763-9:2015 Part 9: On demand model selection
 ISO/IEC 19763-10:2014 Part 10: Core model and basic mapping 
 ISO/IEC 19763-12:2015 Part 12: Metamodel for information model registration
 ISO/IEC TS 19763-13:2016 Part 13: Metamodel for form design registration
 ISO/IEC TR 19764:2005 Information technology – Guidelines, methodology and reference criteria for cultural and linguistic adaptability in information technology products
 ISO/IEC TR 19768:2007 Information technology - Programming languages - Technical Report on C++ Library Extensions
 ISO/IEC 19770 Information technology – Software asset management
 ISO/IEC 19772:2009 Information technology - Security techniques - Authenticated encryption
 ISO/IEC 19773:2011 Information technology - Metadata Registries (MDR) modules
 ISO/IEC 19774:2006 Information technology - Computer graphics and image processing - Humanoid Animation (H-Anim)
 ISO/IEC 19775 Information technology—Computer graphics, image processing and environmental data representation—Extensible 3D (X3D)
 ISO/IEC 19775-1:2013 Part 1: Architecture and base components
 ISO/IEC 19775-2:2015 Part 2: Scene access interface (SAI)
 ISO/IEC 19776 Information technology - Computer graphics, image processing and environmental data representation - Extensible 3D (X3D) encodings
 ISO/IEC 19776-1:2015 Part 1: Extensible Markup Language (XML) encoding
 ISO/IEC 19776-2:2015 Part 2: Classic VRML encoding
 ISO/IEC 19776-3:2015 Part 3: Compressed binary encoding
 ISO/IEC 19777 Information technology - Computer graphics and image processing - Extensible 3D (X3D) language bindings
 ISO/IEC 19777-1:2006 Part 1: ECMAScript
 ISO/IEC 19777-2:2006 Part 2: Java
 ISO/IEC 19778 Information technology - Learning, education and training - Collaborative technology - Collaborative workplace
 ISO/IEC 19778-1:2015 Part 1: Collaborative workplace data model
 ISO/IEC 19778-2:2015 Part 2: Collaborative environment data model
 ISO/IEC 19778-3:2015 Part 3: Collaborative group data model
 ISO/IEC 19780 Information technology - Learning, education and training - Collaborative technology - Collaborative learning communication
 ISO/IEC 19780-1:2015 Part 1: Text-based communication
 ISO/IEC TR 19782:2006 Information technology - Automatic identification and data capture techniques - Effects of gloss and low substrate opacity on reading of bar code symbols
 ISO/IEC 19784 Information technology – Biometric application programming interface
 ISO/IEC 19784-1:2006 Part 1: BioAPI specification
 ISO/IEC 19784-2:2007 Part 2: Biometric archive function provider interface
 ISO/IEC 19784-4:2011 Part 4: Biometric sensor function provider interface
 ISO/IEC 19785 Information technology – Common Biometric Exchange Formats Framework
 ISO/IEC 19785-1:2015 Part 1: Data element specification
 ISO/IEC 19785-2:2006 Part 2: Procedures for the operation of the Biometric Registration Authority
 ISO/IEC 19785-3:2015 Part 3: Patron format specifications
 ISO/IEC 19785-4:2010 Part 4: Security block format specifications
 ISO/IEC 19788 Information technology – Learning, education and training – Metadata for learning resources
 ISO/IEC 19790:2012 Information technology – Security techniques – Security requirements for cryptographic modules
 ISO/IEC TR 19791:2010 Information technology - Security techniques - Security assessment of operational systems
 ISO/IEC 19792:2009 Information technology - Security techniques - Security evaluation of biometrics
 ISO/IEC 19793 Information technology - Open Distributed Processing—Use of UML for ODP system specifications
 ISO/IEC 19794 Information technology – Biometric data interchange formats
 ISO/IEC 19794-1:2011 Part 1: Framework
 ISO/IEC 19794-2:2011 Part 2: Finger minutiae data
 ISO/IEC 19794-3:2006 Part 3: Finger pattern spectral data
 ISO/IEC 19794-4:2011 Part 4: Finger image data
 ISO/IEC 19794-5:2011 Part 5: Face image data
 ISO/IEC 19794-6:2011 Part 6: Iris image data
 ISO/IEC 19794-7:2014 Part 7: Signature/sign time series data
 ISO/IEC 19794-8:2011 Part 8: Finger pattern skeletal data
 ISO/IEC 19794-9:2011 Part 9: Vascular image data
 ISO/IEC 19794-10:2007 Part 10: Hand geometry silhouette data
 ISO/IEC 19794-11:2013 Part 11: Signature/sign processed dynamic data
 ISO/IEC 19794-14:2013 Part 14: DNA data
 ISO/IEC 19794-15:2017 Part 15: Palm crease image data
 ISO/IEC 19795 Information technology – Biometric performance testing and reporting
 ISO/IEC 19795-1:2006 Part 1: Principles and framework
 ISO/IEC 19795-2:2007 Part 2: Testing methodologies for technology and scenario evaluation
 ISO/IEC TR 19795-3:2007 Part 3: Modality-specific testing
 ISO/IEC 19795-4:2008 Part 4: Interoperability performance testing
 ISO/IEC 19795-5:2011 Part 5: Access control scenario and grading scheme
 ISO/IEC 19795-6:2012 Part 6: Testing methodologies for operational evaluation
 ISO/IEC 19795-7:2011 Part 7: Testing of on-card biometric comparison algorithms
 ISO/IEC 19796 Information technology - Learning, education and training - Quality management, assurance and metrics
 ISO/IEC 19796-1:2005 Part 1: General approach
 ISO/IEC 19796-3:2009 Part 3: Reference methods and metrics
 ISO/TR 19814:2017 Information and documentation - Collections management for archives and libraries
 ISO/IEC 19831:2015 Cloud Infrastructure Management Interface (CIMI) Model and RESTful HTTP-based Protocol – An Interface for Managing Cloud Infrastructure
 ISO/TR 19838:2016 Microbiology – Cosmetics – Guidelines for the application of ISO standards on Cosmetic Microbiology
 ISO/IEC TS 19841:2015 Technical Specification for C++ Extensions for Transactional Memory
 ISO/TS 19844:2016 Health informatics – Identification of medicinal products – Implementation guidelines for data elements and structures for the unique identification and exchange of regulated information on substances
 ISO/IEC 19845:2015 Information technology - Universal business language version 2.1 (UBL v2.1)
 ISO 19859:2016 Gas turbine applications – Requirements for power generation
 ISO 19891 Ships and marine technology - Specifications for gas detectors intended for use on board ships
 ISO 19891-1:2017 Part 1: Portable gas detectors for atmosphere testing of enclosed spaces
 ISO/TR 19948:2016 Earth-moving machinery – Conformity assessment and certification process
 ISO 19952:2005 Footwear – Vocabulary
 ISO/TS 19979:2014 Ophthalmic optics – Contact lenses – Hygienic management of multipatient use trial contact lenses
 ISO 19980:2012 Ophthalmic instruments – Corneal topographers
 ISO/IEC 19987:2015 Information technology - EPC Information services - Specification
 ISO/IEC 19988:2015 Information technology - GS1 Core Business Vocabulary (CBV)
 ISO 19993 Timber structures—Glued laminated timber—Face and edge joint cleavage test

Notes

References

External links 
 International Organization for Standardization
 ISO Certification Provider
 ISO Consultant

International Organization for Standardization